Piątek or Piontek is a surname meaning "Friday" in Polish. Pronounced identically, both forms occur in Poland but the standard spelling, Piątek, is about ten times as common. In other countries, Piontek may be more frequent to prevent mispronunciation. Piątek is also used as a toponym in Poland.

People

Piątek
 Karol Piątek (born 1982), Polish footballer
 Krzysztof Piątek (born 1995), Polish footballer
 Łukasz Piątek (born 1985), Polish footballer
 Marek Marian Piątek (born 1954), Polish-Brazilian Catholic bishop
 Piotr Piątek (born 1982), Polish archer
 Waldemar Piątek (born 1979), Polish footballer
 Zbigniew Piątek (born 1966), Polish road racing cyclist

Piontek
 Dave Piontek (1934–2004), American basketball player
 Heinz Piontek (1925–2003), German writer
 Leonard Piontek (1913–1967), Polish footballer
 Sepp Piontek (born 1940), German footballer
 Zack Piontek (born 1991), South African judoka
 Purple Disco Machine - Tino Piontek (born 1980), German dj.

Places 
 Piątek, Łódź Voivodeship, village in central Poland
 Piątek Mały, village in Greater Poland Voivodeship
 Piątek Mały-Kolonia, village in Greater Poland Voivodeship
 Piątek Wielki, village in Greater Poland Voivodeship
 Gmina Piątek, administrative district in Łódź Voivodeship

See also
 
 
Surnames from nicknames

Polish-language surnames